Michael Evan Victor Baillie, 3rd Baron Burton DL  (27 June 192430 May 2013) was a British peer and maternal grandson of the 9th Duke of Devonshire.

The son of George Evan Michael Baillie and Maud Louisa Emma Cavendish, he was educated at Eton College and served as lieutenant in the Scots Guards in World War II.

In 1962 he inherited the title of Baron Burton from his paternal grandmother Nellie Baillie, 2nd Baroness Burton.

He was an elected county councillor for Inverness-shire 1948–75 and a justice of the peace (J.P.) 1961–75.

He lived at Dochgarroch Lodge, Inverness and died there on 30 May 2013.

Marriages and children
On 28 April 1948, he married Elizabeth Ursula Foster Wise (d. 1993).   They divorced in 1977 after having six children:

Evan Michael Ronald Baillie (b. 19 March 1949)
Elizabeth Victoria Baillie (b. 9 March 1950, d. 1986)
Phillipa Ursula Maud Baillie (b. 30 August 1951)
Georgina Frances Baillie (b. 11 May 1955)
Fiona Mary Baillie (b. 31 October 1957, d. 9 October 2004)
Alexander Baillie (b. 1963) who manages the family estate at Dochfour.

In 1978, he married Coralie Denise Cliffe of Natal, South Africa (d. 17 January 2022).

Freemasonry
He became a Scottish Freemason having been initiated in Lodge Old Inverness Kilwinning St. John's, No.6, (Inverness-shire) in 1951. He served as master of that lodge 1978–1979. He was also a member of Lodge Sir Robert Moray, No.1641, (Edinburgh, Scotland). He was installed as Grand Master Mason on 25 November 1993, within Freemasons' Hall, 96 George Street, Edinburgh.

References
Burke's Peerage
Who's Who 2009

1924 births
2013 deaths
3
British Army personnel of World War II
Councillors in Highland (council area)
Deputy Lieutenants of Inverness-shire
People educated at Eton College
Scots Guards officers

Burton